The white-tailed starfrontlet (Coeligena phalerata) is a species of hummingbird in the "brilliants", tribe Heliantheini in subfamily Lesbiinae. It is endemic to the Sierra Nevada de Santa Marta of northeastern Colombia.

Taxonomy and systematics

The white-tailed starfrontlet and most other members of genus Coeligena were at one time placed in genus Helianthea but have been in their current placement since the mid-1900s. The species is monotypic.

Description

Both sexes have a long, straight, black bill, with the female's being somewhat longer than the male's. Both sexes have a white spot behind the eye. Both sexes also have a forked tail, but the male's is more deeply indented than the female's. Adult males have metallic dark green upperparts with a glittering turquoise crown. The entire tail is white, though the feathers when fresh have bronze tips. They have a blue gorget, mostly emerald green underparts, white leg puffs, and white undertail coverts. Adult females have a dusky blue-green crown and shining green upperparts. The tail is bronzy with pale buff tips to the feathers. Its underparts are rufous cinnamon. Immatures are similar to the adult female.

Distribution and habitat

The white-tailed starfrontlet is found only in northeast Colombia's isolated Sierra Nevada de Santa Marta. It inhabits humid to wet montane forest; males prefer openings within the forest while females are more often seen at the forest edge.

Behavior

Movement

Nothing is known about the white-tailed starfrontlet's movements, if any.

Feeding

The white-tailed starfrontlet feeds on nectar. Sources are known to include Fuchsia and bromeliads, though it probably feeds on a wide variety of plants like others of its genus. It is more territorial than other Coeligena but also sometimes feeds by trap-lining. In addition to feeding on nectar it captures small arthropods by gleaning from foliage and by hawking.

Breeding

The white-tailed starfrontlet's breeding season appears to span from February to April, but nothing else is known about its breeding phenology.

Vocalization

Only a few white-tailed starfrontlet vocalizations have been recorded. It is known to make "a high-pitched chattering 'tsee-tsee-tsi-tsi-tsirrrrr' and lower-pitched short rattles."

Status

The IUCN originally assessed the white-tailed starfrontlet as being of Least Concern but since 2018 has rated it as Near Threatened. It has a very small range "where it is under threat of habitat loss and fragmentation". Its population size is not known and is believed to be decreasing.

References

white-tailed starfrontlet
Birds of the Sierra Nevada de Santa Marta
Endemic birds of Colombia
white-tailed starfrontlet
Taxonomy articles created by Polbot